Adinah is Laban's wife in the Bible.

Adinah may also refer to:
 Adinah, Yemen
 Adinah Alexander, Broadway actress; see Parade (musical)

See also
 Adena (disambiguation)
 Adina (disambiguation)